Adriaen, or Jan van Alen (1651–1698) was a painter from the Northern Netherlands.
He was born as the son of the animal painter Jacob van Oolen in Amsterdam, with whom his works are sometimes confused. He became an imitator of Melchior Hondekoeter, and his pictures, like those of that master, represent fowls, landscapes, and still-life.

Works 
Though inferior to Hondekoeter, he painted those objects with great fidelity. He also imitated other masters of the period with so much success that his copies have often passed for originals. He died in Amsterdam.

References

Attribution:
 

1651 births
1698 deaths
Painters from Amsterdam
Dutch Golden Age painters
Dutch male painters